is a puzzle video game released in arcades by Taito in February 1998. It features characters from Taito games Rainbow Islands, Kiki Kaikai, Don Doko Don, and The NewZealand Story,

The game was ported to the PlayStation and Game Boy Color. The Game Boy Color version was also released in North America with Yogi Bear characters, under the title Yogi Bear: Great Balloon Blast.

Gameplay
Gameplay is a hybrid of Puzzle Bobble, Arkanoid, and Space Invaders. Rows of coloured balloons advance down the screen, and the player must shoot their own balloons at them. When three balloons of the same colour match up, they disappear.

Ports
The game was released in Japan and Europe for the PlayStation and Game Boy Color. Both the PlayStation and Game Boy Color versions added additional characters from other Taito games, such as Bubblun from Bubble Symphony, Ptolemy from The Fairyland Story, Chack'n from Chack'n Pop, Hipopo from Liquid Kids, and Drunk from Bubble Bobble. Chack'n, Hipopo and Drunk are hidden in the PlayStation version, but initially playable in the Game Boy Color version.

A Microsoft Windows version was developed by Dreams and was released in the UK by Vektorlogic Ltd., and in Japan by CyberFront around. It does not include the secret characters of the PlayStation version.

Legacy
A version was also announced for the Wii console for release in Europe in 2007, according to the Q2 Update posted by Nintendo of Europe. However, in common with other planned updates of Taito franchises such as KiKi KaiKai 2, Taito appear to have withdrawn their license for unknown reasons, and the game was reworked and released under the name Balloon Pop in North America and Pop! in Europe.

The original arcade version also appeared in the Xbox and Microsoft Windows versions of Taito Legends 2, though missing the arcade and PlayStation's 15 kHz scan-lined video output (they feature upscaled graphics instead), and to date has not been collected in any of the Japanese Taito Memories compilations. The PlayStation version was re-released on the PlayStation Network on January 13, 2009, in Japan.

References

1998 video games
Arcade video games
CyberFront games
Game Boy Color games
Multiplayer and single-player video games
PlayStation (console) games
PlayStation Network games
Puzzle video games
Taito arcade games
Video games based on Yogi Bear
Video games developed in Japan